Information Service(s), or information service(s) may refer to:

 Information broker services, provided by a company which collects data for use by a third party
 Information service, a term defined by the US Communications Act of 1934
 Information services, a group of services offered by a library or other institution
 Information services, a group of services offered by information professionals of various types
 Information Services, a unit or department in an enterprise responsible for delivering information systems
 Information Services Corporation, a company providing registry and information services to the Government of Saskatchewan, Canada
 Information Services Department (ISD), public relations office of the Hong Kong Government
 Information Services Division (ISD), part of NHS Scotland that provides health information
 Information technology services of various types

See also
Information science
Information system
 Business Information Services Library, a public domain standard used for information management
 Indian Information Service (IIS), Indian Government media, information and news civil service
 Information Services & Use, a scientific journal covering information management and applications
 Information Systems & Services, former department of the UK Ministry of Defence 
 Information Services Procurement Library (ISPL), a best practice framework for the procurement of information services
 Internet Information Services (IIS), web server software created by Microsoft
 Network Information Service (NIS), formerly UK Yellow Pages
 Participatory information service, an information service with two-way flow with its users